Henry Eyre may refer to:

Henry Eyre (barrister) (1628–1678), politician and lawyer
Henry Eyre (British Army officer) (1834–1904), British Army officer and politician

See also
Henry Eyres, British viscount and WW2 lieutenant-colonel